Huang Junhua  (born 29 December 1991) is a professional wushu taolu athlete from Macau. He is a two-time world champion and the second ever gold medallist for Macau at the Asian Games.

Career 
Huang made his international debut at the 2012 Asian Wushu Championships where he won a bronze medal in nanquan. He then competed in the 2013 East Asian Games and won bronze medals in nanquan and duilian. He also competed in the 2013 World Wushu Championships the same year where he claimed a silver medal in nandao. A year later, Huang competed in the 2014 Asian Games and won the silver medal men's nanquan. Another year later, he competed in the 2015 World Wushu Championships in Jakarta, Indonesia, where he became the world champion in nangun and additionally won a silver medal in nanquan. He then won two bronze medals in the 2016 Asian Wushu Championships in nanquan and nandao. Following this, he competed in the 2017 World Wushu Championships in Kazan, Russia, where he was a world champion in nandao and also a silver medalist in nanquan.

A year later, Huang claimed a historical gold medal for Macau at the 2018 Asian Games in the men's nanquan event, which was the second ever gold medal for Macau at the Asian Games. His high placements at the 207 world championships helped him qualify for the 2018 Taolu World Cup where he won a gold and bronze medal in nandao and nangun respectively. His most recent appearance was at the 2019 World Wushu Championships in Shanghai, China, where he won a silver medal in nangun and a bronze medal in nanquan.

Honours 
Awarded by the Macau SAR Government:

 Silver Lotus Medal of Honour (2018)

Macau Outstanding Athletes Election 

 Honorary Athletes Awards (2015, 2017)

See also 

 List of Asian Games medalists in wushu

References 

1991 births
Living people
Macau wushu practitioners
Wushu practitioners at the 2014 Asian Games
Wushu practitioners at the 2018 Asian Games
Medalists at the 2014 Asian Games
Medalists at the 2018 Asian Games
Asian Games gold medalists for Macau
Asian Games silver medalists for Macau
Asian Games medalists in wushu